The Veterans Coalition Party of Canada is a Canadian political party established on August 8, 2019.
In the 2019 Canadian federal election, 25 candidates of the party stood for election in eight provinces, garnering 6,300 votes. In the 2021 Canadian federal election, seven Veterans Coalition Party of Canada candidates stood for election, including four in the Alberta ridings of Battle River—Crowfoot, Edmonton—Wetaskiwin, Fort McMurray—Cold Lake and Yellowhead. Several candidates, including leader Randy Joy, are retired servicemen. The party's motto is "Truth, Duty, Honour" and its platform includes decentralisation of power.

Electoral results

See also
 Soldier (party), party label used by candidates in Canadian elections during and after the First World War

References

2019 establishments in Alberta
Single-issue political parties in Canada